Aloisi is a surname. Notable people with the surname include:

 Antonio Aloisi (born 1968), Italian footballer and manager
 Baldassare Aloisi (1578–1638), Italian painter
 Chris Aloisi (born 1981), American footballer
 Irene Aloisi (1925–1980), Italian actress
 James Aloisi, American lawyer and politician
 John Aloisi (born 1976), Australian footballer
 Ross Aloisi (born 1973), Australian footballer

See also
 Aloisi Masella (disambiguation)
 Alozie, surname
 Meryem Benm'Barek-Aloïsi (born 1984), Moroccan film director and screenwriter
 Polyommatus aloisi, species of butterfly
 Premio Carlo e Francesco Aloisi, Italian horse race

Italian-language surnames